Luciano Fabián Monzón (born 13 April 1987) is an Argentine professional footballer who plays as a left-back.

Club career

Boca Juniors
Born in Granadero Baigorria, Monzón began his professional career with Boca Juniors in 2007 after being promoted out of the club's youth academy. He made his Boca Juniors debut during the 2008 Clausura tournament in Boca Juniors, and was a surprise choice for the Argentina squad for the 2008 Olympic Games later that year. This doubt was put to rest as Monzón started every match as the team went on to win gold.

Unsurprisingly, after Monzón's performance at the Olympics he moved to Europe to play for Real Betis in La Liga for a reported €9 million after being linked with a move to German side, Hamburg since the Olympics had begun. It was later revealed that Monzón had moved on a loan deal with the option to purchase the player outright in the summer of 2009. Monzón scored his first goal with Betis on his debut against FC Barcelona at the Camp Nou on 24 September 2008, however, Real Betis eventually lost the game 3–2.

Monzón returned to Boca after his loan deal with Betis ran out in July 2009. Upon his return he revealed his remarkably low wage compared to other stars at Boca.

In his first season back with Boca, Monzón earned a regular playing time for his native club, playing in 23 league matches, with 2 goals. In August 2010, after his first season back in Argentina, he had two failed transfer attempts. First, he failed to move to Ukrainian side Dnipro due to a congenital heart condition and a few days later a second transfer was cancelled, this time to Serie A team Udinese, admittedly by differences in payment method. Despite the failed transfer attempts, Monzón continued to feature for the club, making 20 league appearances during the 2010-11 campaign, which ultimately would be his last at the club, before finally completing a permanent transfer to Europe with French side, OGC Nice.

OGC Nice
On 11 July 2011 Monzón signed a 4-year contract with OGC Nice in the French Ligue 1. Monzón made his debut for Nice on 6 August 2011, in a 1–3 home loss against Lyon. During his one and only season in Nice, he was a regular feature in the club's starting lineup, managing 34 league appearances, marked with 8 goals, a great performance for a left defender. Monzón was set to begin the 2012–13 season with Nice, before completing a late transfer to Lyon on 26 August 12. His final match for Nice came on the opening matchday of the 2012–13 season: a 0–1 home defeat to Ajaccio on 11 August 2012.

Olympique Lyonnais
On 26 August 2012, Monzón officially was unveiled as a new signining for 7-time French champions Olympique Lyonnais on a 4-year contract. Monzón was purchased by the club to replace Aly Cissokho who signed for Valencia earlier in the summer.  The transfer fee was worth €3 million with bonus variables of up to €1 million. With Lyon, the player began the season as a first team regular before losing his place in the team sheet after just 5 league appearances. Goal.com named Monzón as the worst transfer signing of the 2012–13 season.

On 9 January 2013, Monzón signed a 6-month loan deal with Brazilian national champions Fluminense in order to replace Thiago Carleto who returned to São Paulo. He returned to Lyon on 16 July 2013 before being sold to Serie A side Catania.

Calcio Catania
On 16 July 2013, Monzón officially signed for Calcio Catania in the Italian Serie A on a four-year contract for €3.3 million, while a further €300,000 could be paid on performance-related bonuses.

Return to Boca Juniors
In 2015, Monzón returned to his first club, Boca Juniors.

Universidad de Chile
On 20 January 2016, Monzón signed for Club Universidad de Chile on a free transfer.

International career

Monzón was a member of the Argentine squad for the 2008 Beijing Olympics, which also were figures like Lionel Messi, Sergio Agüero, Ángel Di María and Juan Román Riquelme. Argentina went on to win his second consecutive gold medal in those Olympics.

He has been sporadically nominated for the Argentina national football team, accumulating seven appearances since 2009.

Honours

Club
Boca Juniors
Primera División (1): 2015
Copa Argentina (1): 2015

International
Argentina U-23
Summer Olympics Gold Medal: 1
 2008

References

External links
 
 Guardian statistics 
 Argentine Primera statistics at Fútbol XXI 
 Monzón, Luciano Fabián  at Historia de Boca.com 
 

1987 births
Living people
Footballers from Rosario, Santa Fe
Argentine footballers
Argentine expatriate footballers
Argentina international footballers
Association football defenders
Footballers at the 2008 Summer Olympics
Olympic footballers of Argentina
Olympic gold medalists for Argentina
Real Betis players
OGC Nice players
Catania S.S.D. players
Boca Juniors footballers
Olympique Lyonnais players
Fluminense FC players
Universidad de Chile footballers
Atlético Tucumán footballers
La Liga players
Ligue 1 players
Serie A players
Serie B players
Argentine Primera División players
Chilean Primera División players
Campeonato Brasileiro Série A players
Expatriate footballers in Chile
Expatriate footballers in Spain
Expatriate footballers in Italy
Expatriate footballers in France
Expatriate footballers in Brazil
Argentine expatriate sportspeople in Chile
Argentine expatriate sportspeople in Spain
Argentine expatriate sportspeople in Italy
Argentine expatriate sportspeople in France
Argentine expatriate sportspeople in Brazil
Olympic medalists in football
Medalists at the 2008 Summer Olympics